The Paberžė Regiment was a Lithuanian infantry regiment commanded by Antanas Mackevičius during the Uprising of 1863. It was named after the village Paberžė. The regiment fought mostly in the Kaunas Governorate and ranged in strength from 700 to 1,170 members.

Formation 
On March 8, the priest Antanas Mackevičius read out the National Government's manifesto and its decrees during his sermon. After Holy Mass, about 300 people moved to the Krekenava forest, from whom the Paberžės regiment was formed. Their weaponry consisted of scythes and old guns. The uprising's leadership gave the name of Paberžė regiment to A. Mackevičius' party.

Composition 
The unit was mainly made up of local Lithuanian peasants, but there were also representatives of the gentry, mainly the poor, urban youth and students. Germans, Prussian Lithuanians and volunteers from Mazovia also joined the unit. The officers were mainly fugitives from the Imperial Russian army, as well as cadets from the Polish military school in Cuneo. Unit was soon joined by Bolesław Kołyszko as a military instructor.

Flag 

His unit used a banner sewn from two parts: the top navy blue and the bottom crimson. On the other side was an oil painted image of the Virgin Mary and St. Elisabeth. The regiment also had its own flag, which was entrusted to Juozas Damalakas, who was 16 years old in 1863 and was the regiment's youngest member.

Uniform 
The insurgents wore gray knee-length sukmanas girdled with a leather belt, and the officers wore czamaras. On their heads, they wore rogatywka-style hats trimmed with sheep fur (so called krakuska).

References

Sources 

 
 
 

January Uprising
Infantry regiments of Lithuania